The 2021–22 season was the 118th season in the existence of R. Charleroi S.C. and the club's 10th consecutive season in the top flight of Belgian football. In addition to the domestic league, R. Charleroi S.C. participated in this season's edition of the Belgian Cup.

Players

First-team squad

On loan

Transfers

Loans in

Pre-season and friendlies

Competitions

Overall record

First Division A

League table

Results summary

Results by round

Matches
The league fixtures were announced on 8 June 2021.

Play-Off II

Results summary

Results by round

Matches

Belgian Cup

References

R. Charleroi S.C. seasons
Charleroi